Senna, the sennas, is a large genus of flowering plants in the legume family (Fabaceae, subfamily Caesalpinioideae, tribe Cassieae). This diverse genus is native throughout the tropics, with a small number of species in temperate regions. The number of species is estimated to be from about 260 to 350. The type species for the genus is Senna alexandrina. About 50 species of Senna are known in cultivation.

Description
Senna includes herbs, shrubs, and trees. The leaves are pinnate with opposite paired leaflets. The inflorescences are racemes at the ends of branches or emerging from the leaf axils. The flower has five sepals and five usually yellow petals. There are ten straight stamens. The stamens may be different sizes, and some are staminodes. The fruit is a legume pod containing several seeds.

Systematics
Chamaecrista, Cassia, and Senna form a monophyletic group which some authors have called Cassia sensu lato. In 1982, the group was named Cassiinae and classified as a subtribe of the tribe Cassieae. The tribe Cassieae contains 21 genera and is now known to be polyphyletic, but the classification is still accepted because a revision of Fabaceae has yet to be published.

The genus Senna has had a complex taxonomic history. What is now known as Senna was included by Linnaeus in his concept of Cassia in Species Plantarum in 1753. Philip Miller segregated Senna from Cassia in 1754 in the fourth edition of The Gardeners Dictionary. Until 1982, many authors, following Linnaeus, did not recognize Senna and Chamaecrista, but included them in a broadly circumscribed Cassia sensu lato. Phylogenetic analyses of DNA have shown that Chamaecrista, Cassia, and Senna are all monophyletic, but the relationships between these three genera have not been resolved. They are therefore shown in phylogenetic trees as a tritomy.

Etymology
The genus name derives from the Arabic sanā, describing plants whose leaves and pods have cathartic and laxative properties.

Species
, Plants of the World Online accepted the following species:

Ecology
The caterpillars of many species feed on Senna plants. The black witch (Ascalapha odorata), two-barred flasher (Astraptes fulgerator), common emigrant (Catopsilia pomona), and mottled emigrant (C. pyranthe) have all been recorded on candle bush (S. alata), for example.

Some species have extrafloral nectaries on the leaves or flower stalks that are visited by ants.

Pollination
Senna species are pollinated by a variety of bees, especially large female bees in genera such as Xylocopa. They rely on "buzz pollination" and some within that on "ricochet pollination", which is a secondary pollen presentation where the pollen is not deposited on the pollinator's body by direct contact with the anthers. The flowers have two sets of stamen: feeding stamens, which are longer, and pollinating stamens, which are smaller in size. Due to buzz pollination, the pollens from the pollinating stamens get thrown from the anthers and ricochets against the petals multiple times before it settles on the dorsal side of the pollinating bee. The roughness on the petal walls causes the pollen to slow down its speed. The ricocheting effect alone cannot ensure effective pollen dissemination. It is aided by static charges wherein the flying bees become positively charged owing to the friction in the air and the pollen becomes negatively charged because of which they naturally get attracted to the bees body. The pollinator bee ends up carrying the pollen and also gets to feed on the pollen which is on the feeding stamens.

Uses
Some Senna species are used as ornamental plants in landscaping. The species is adapted to many climate types.

Cassia gum, an extract of the seeds of Chinese senna (S. obtusifolia), is used as a thickening agent. The leaves and flowers of Siamese cassia (S. siamea) are used in some Southeast Asian cuisines, such as Thai, Shan/Burmese and Lao cuisines. They are known as khi-lek in Thai, and are used in curries.

Laxative
Throughout history Egyptian senna (S. alexandrina) has been used for its laxative properties, either in the form of senna pods or as herbal tea made from the leaves. Senna is considered to be a bowel stimulant on the myenteric plexus of the colon to induce peristaltic contractions and decrease water absorption from inside the colon, effects that would provide relief from constipation. The laxative syrup of figs gets most of its effect from the presence of senna.

Senna or its extracted sennosides, alone or in combination with sorbitol or lactulose, have been evaluated in systematic reviews and Cochrane reviews for treatment of constipation in children and the elderly. Some studies showed limited evidence for efficacy, whereas others indicated the study designs were too weak to be certain of senna having utility as a laxative.

Fossil record

A fossil seed pod of Senna sp. from the middle Eocene epoch has been described from the Rancho clay pit in Henry County, Tennessee (United States).

References

Fabaceae genera
Taxa named by Philip Miller